Ponder is an extinct town in southwestern Ripley County, in the U.S. state of Missouri. The GNIS classifies it as a populated place. The community is located on Missouri Route 142 between Doniphan to the east and Gatewood to the west. Fourche Creek passes just east of the site.

A post office called Ponder was established in 1888, and remained in operation until 1957. The community has the name of Pleasant John Ponder, the original owner of the town site.

References

Ghost towns in Missouri
Former populated places in Ripley County, Missouri